Ranella australasia is a species of large predatory sea snail, a marine gastropod mollusk in the family Ranellidae, the triton snails, triton shells or tritons.

Description

Distribution
THis species is endemic to Australia and occurs off New South Wales, South Australia, Tasmania, Victoria and Western Australia

References

 Wilson, B. 1993. Australian Marine Shells. Prosobranch Gastropods. Kallaroo, Western Australia : Odyssey Publishing Vol. 1 408 pp.

External links

Ranellidae
Gastropods described in 1811